Joanna Mirek (née Podoba) (born 17 February 1977) is a Polish volleyball player, a member of Poland women's national volleyball team in 1996–2007, double European Champion (2003, 2005), six-time Polish Champion (2001, 2002, 2006, 2008, 2009, 2014).

Career

National team
On September 28, 2003 Poland women's national volleyball team, including Mirek, beat Turkey (3–0) in final and won title of European Champion 2003. Two years later, Polish team with Mirek in squad defended title and achieved second title of European Champion.

Sporting achievements

National team
 2003  CEV European Championship
 2005  CEV European Championship

State awards
 2005  Gold Cross of Merit

References

1977 births
Living people
People from Myślenice
Sportspeople from Lesser Poland Voivodeship
Polish women's volleyball players
Recipients of the Gold Cross of Merit (Poland)